Patrick Brontë (commonly ; born Patrick Brunty; 17 March 1777 – 7 June 1861) was an Irish Anglican priest and author who spent most of his adult life in England. He was the father of the writers Charlotte, Emily, and Anne Brontë, and of Branwell Brontë, his only son. Patrick outlived his wife, the former Maria Branwell, by forty years, by which time all of their six children had died as well.

Early life

Brontë was born Patrick Brunty at Drumballyroney, near Rathfriland, County Down (now in Northern Ireland), the eldest of the ten children of "farmhand, fence-fixer, and road-builder" Hugh Brunty, an Anglican, and Elinor Alice (née McClory), an Irish Catholic. The family was "large and very poor", owning four books (including two copies of the Bible) and subsisting on "porridge, potatoes, buttermilk and bread" which "gave Patrick a lifetime of indigestion".

He had several apprenticeships (to a blacksmith, a linen draper, and a weaver) until he became a teacher in 1798. He moved to England in 1802, having won a scholarship to study theology as a sizar at St John's College, Cambridge, first registered as "Branty" or "Brunty", then "Brontë", receiving his AB degree in 1806. 

In adult life, Patrick Brunty formally changed the spelling of his name to Brontë; while the reason for this change remains unclear there are a number of prominent theories to explain it.

Curate

He was appointed curate at Wethersfield, near Braintree in Essex, where he was ordained a deacon of the Church of England in 1806, and into the priesthood in 1807.

Brontë's first post as curate was at St Mary Magdalene Church, Wethersfield, Essex with the vicar being Joseph Jowett, Regius Professor of Law at Cambridge. Here in 1807 he met and fell in love with Mary Burder. After a disagreement and an undisclosed insult, with Burder's father's brother, her legal guardian, Mary was shipped out of town and Patrick decided it was best to take a new curacy. It was shortly after this period his first poetry was published.

In 1809, he became assistant curate at Wellington, Shropshire, and in 1810 his first published poem, the 256 line Winter Evening Thoughts, appeared in a local newspaper, followed in 1811 by a collection of moral verses, Cottage Poems. He moved to the West Riding of Yorkshire as a curate at All Saints, Dewsbury (now Dewsbury Minster) in December 1809. The area was undergoing an evangelical revival under the incumbent vicar John Buckworth. Brontë taught reading and writing at Dewsbury's Sunday School and was deputised by Buckworth to attend twice weekly meetings of the Church Mission Society on his behalf. A memorial plaque to Brontë can be found on the South Aisle of Dewsbury Minster.

Buckworth appointed Brontë as an assistant curate to the Church of St Peter, Hartshead, a daughter church of Dewsbury in 1811. He served at Hartshead until 1815. In the meantime (1812) he was appointed a school examiner at a Wesleyan academy, Woodhouse Grove School, near Guiseley. In 1815 he moved again on becoming perpetual curate of Thornton.

Family

At Guiseley, Brontë met Maria Branwell (1783–1821), whom he married on 29 December 1812 in the Church of St. Oswald. They moved into a house on Halifax Road, Liversedge, where their first two children, Maria (1813–1825) and Elizabeth (1814–1825) were born. Their remaining children Charlotte (1816–1855), Patrick Branwell (1817–1848), Emily (1818–1848) and Anne (1820–1849) were born after they moved to Thornton.

Brontë was offered the perpetual curacy of St Michael and All Angels' Church, Haworth in June 1819, and he took the family there in April 1820.  His sister-in-law Elizabeth Branwell (1776–1842), who had lived with the family at Thornton in 1815, joined the household in 1821 to help to look after the children and to care for Maria Brontë, who was ill, possibly suffering the final stages of what may have been uterine cancer or ovarian cancer. Elizabeth decided to move permanently to Haworth to act as housekeeper. 

Patrick Brontë sought out Mary Burder, his first love, and inquired after her hand in marriage; Burder declined. After several attempts to seek a new spouse, Patrick came to terms with widowhood at the age of 47, and spent his time visiting the sick and the poor, giving sermons, communion, and extreme unction, leaving the three sisters Emily, Charlotte, Anne, and their brother Branwell alone with their aunt and a maid, Tabitha Aykroyd (Tabby), who tirelessly recounted local legends in her Yorkshire dialect while preparing the meals.

Brontë was responsible for the building of a Sunday school in Haworth, which he opened in 1832. He remained active in local causes into his old age, and between 1849 and 1850 organised action to procure a clean water supply for the village, which was eventually achieved in 1856.

In August 1846, Brontë travelled to Manchester, accompanied by Charlotte, to undergo surgery on his eyes. On 28 August he was operated upon, without anaesthetic, to remove cataracts. Surgeons did not yet know how to use stitches to hold the incision in the eye together and as a consequence the patient was required to lie quietly in a darkened room, for weeks after the operation. Charlotte used her time in Manchester to begin writing Jane Eyre, the book which was to make her famous.

After the death of his last surviving child, Charlotte, nine months after her marriage, he co-operated with Elizabeth Gaskell on the biography of his daughter. He was also responsible for the posthumous publication of Charlotte's first novel, The Professor, in 1857. Charlotte's husband, Arthur Bell Nicholls (1819–1906), who had been Brontë's curate, stayed in the household until he returned to Ireland after Patrick Brontë's death, at the age of 84, in 1861. Brontë outlived not only his wife (by 40 years) but all six of his children.

Publications 
Winter Evening Thoughts, (1810). Cottage Poems, (1810). The Rural Minstrel: A Miscellany of Descriptive Poems, (1813). The Cottage In The Wood, (1816). The Maid Of Killarney, (1818). The Signs Of The Times, (1835).

Portrayals

 Montagu Love portrayed Patrick Brontë in Devotion (1946)
 Alfred Burke portrayed Patrick Brontë in The Brontës of Haworth (1973)
 Patrick Magee portrayed Patrick Brontë in The Brontë Sisters (1979)
 Jonathan Pryce portrayed Patrick Brontë in To Walk Invisible (2016)
 Adrian Dunbar portrayed Patrick Brontë in Emily (2022)

References

Further reading
 The Letters of the Reverend Patrick Brontë  Edited by Dudley Green Foreword by Asa Briggs (Nonsuch Publishing Ltd 2005)
 A Man of Sorrow: The Life, Letters, and Times of the Rev. Patrick Brontë, John Lock and Canon W.T. Dixon, (1965)
 The Brontës, Juliet Barker (1995)
 Charlotte Brontë: Evolution of Genius Winifred Gerin,(1967)
 The Letters of Charlotte Brontë (3 vols, edited by Margaret Smith), (1995–2003)

External links

Brontë Parsonage Museum in Haworth
 
 
 
 Brontë Family. Italian Translation
 Poems by Patrick Brontë

1777 births
1861 deaths
18th-century Irish people
19th-century Irish writers
19th-century English Anglican priests
Patrick
People from County Down
Alumni of St John's College, Cambridge
Irish biographers
Irish male non-fiction writers
British biographers